The NSW/ACT Rams is an under 18 Australian rules football representative club in the TAC Cup.

The team, under the guidance of AFL NSW/ACT represented New South Wales and the Australian Capital Territory and had the moniker of the Ram, partly derived as an acronym from Riverina, ACT, Murrumbidgee and Sydney, the four regions supplying the bulk of the team's squad.

The Rams joined the Cup in 1996 with another non-Victorian club, the Tassie Mariners.

Both left the competition in 2002 when the TAC Cup became a Victorian-focused competition.  The Rams then played around three or four games a year, with players instead playing club football on the remaining weeks of the year. Prior to the 2014 season, the NSW/ACT Rams was reestablished as a TAC Cup team, with players from the Sydney Swans and Greater Western Sydney Giants young academy sides being picked for the NSW/ACT team. The team plays only 7 games in the competition and cannot qualify for finals like the Victorian teams in the competition.

AFL players
The following former NSW/ACT Rams players have gone on to play in the Australian Football League:
 Tony Armstrong – 
 Paul Bevan – 
 Craig Bird – 
 Craig Bolton – /
 Nick Davis – /
 Ryan Davis – 
 Ben Fixter – 
 Brad Fuller – 
 Ray Hall – 
 Lenny Hayes – 
 Malcolm Lynch – 
 Jarrad McVeigh – 
 Mark McVeigh – 
 Cameron Mooney – /
 Henry Playfair – /
 Lewis Roberts-Thomson – 
 Aaron Rogers – /
 Adam Schneider – /
 Brent Staker – /
 Taylor Walker – 
 Josh Wooden – 
 Jacob Townsend - /
 Isaac Heeney - 
 Luke Breust -

See also
TAC Cup
AFL Draft

References

Australian rules football clubs in the Australian Capital Territory
Australian rules football clubs in New South Wales
Former NAB League clubs
1996 establishments in Australia
Australian rules football clubs established in 1996